Penthophera is a genus of tussock moths in the family Erebidae. The genus was erected by Ernst Friedrich Germar in 1812.

The Global Lepidoptera Names Index and Lepidoptera and Some Other Life Forms only include Penthophera morio as a species in this genus.

Species
The genus contains the following four species:
Penthophera caucasica
Penthophera lutea
Penthophera morio
Penthophera subfusca

References

Lymantriinae
Noctuoidea genera